Local elections were held in Marinduque on May 13, 2019, as part of the 2019 Philippine general election. Voters will select candidates for all local positions: a town mayor, vice mayor and town councilors, as well as members of the Sangguniang Panlalawigan, a vice-governor, a governor and a representative for the lone district of Marinduque in the House of Representatives.

In this election, a number of provincial-level officials are seeking reelection, including incumbent congressman Lord Allan Jay Velasco. Notably, this is the first election since the 1970s where Carmencita Reyes, who had previously served both as congressman and governor, is not running for office, having died in January 2019.

Results

Governor
Romulo Bacorro assumed office after the death of Governor Carmencita Reyes. Instead of running for governor, he is instead running for his old position of Vice Governor in this election as the running mate of former Associate Justice Presbitero Velasco Jr. On May 3, Violet Reyes withdrew from the race.

Vice Governor
Mark Anthony Seño, who assumed the position after Romulo Bacorro became governor, is running for town councilor in Boac as he is ineligible to run for reelection as provincial board member after serving his third term in office.

District Representative
Lord Allan Jay Velasco is the incumbent.

Provincial Board elections

1st District

Municipality: Boac, Mogpog, Gasan

|colspan=5 bgcolor=black|

2nd District
Municipality: Sta. Cruz, Torrijos, Buenavista

|colspan=5 bgcolor=black|

Municipal elections

Parties are as stated in their certificates of candidacy.

Boac

Mayor
Incumbent Roberto Madla is retiring from politics after becoming ineligible to run for reelection as mayor after serving his third term in office.

Vice Mayor
Incumbent Robert Opis is running for mayor.

Mogpog

Mayor
Incumbent Augusto Leo Livelo is running unopposed.

Vice Mayor
Belen Luisaga is the incumbent.

Gasan

Mayor
Rolando Tolentino is the incumbent.

Vice Mayor
Yudel Sosa is the incumbent.

Santa Cruz

Mayor
Marisa Red-Martinez is the incumbent.

Vice Mayor
Geraldine Morales is the incumbent.

Torrijos

Mayor
Incumbent Lorna Velasco, the wife of Presbitero Velasco Jr., is running unopposed.

Vice Mayor
Incumbent Ricardo de Galicia is running unopposed.

Buenavista

Mayor
Incumbent Russel Madrigal is ineligible to run for reelection as mayor after serving his third term in office. His wife, Nancy Madrigal, is running in his stead.

Vice Mayor
Hannilee Siena is the incumbent.

References

 Marinduque Election 2019. Marinduque, Philippines. Ballot Templates Boac . http://www.comelec.gov.ph/php-tpls-attachments/2019NLE/BallotFaceTemplates/REGION_IV-B/MARINDUQUE/BOAC.pdf
 Marinduque Election 2019. Marinduque, Philippines. Ballot Templates Mogpog . http://www.comelec.gov.ph/php-tpls-attachments/2019NLE/BallotFaceTemplates/REGION_IV-B/MARINDUQUE/MOGPOG.pdf
 Marinduque Election 2019. Marinduque, Philippines. Ballot Templates Gasan . http://www.comelec.gov.ph/php-tpls-attachments/2019NLE/BallotFaceTemplates/REGION_IV-B/MARINDUQUE/GASAN.pdf
 Marinduque Election 2019. Marinduque, Philippines. Ballot Templates Santa Cruz . http://www.comelec.gov.ph/php-tpls-attachments/2019NLE/BallotFaceTemplates/REGION_IV-B/MARINDUQUE/SANTA_CRUZ.pdf
 Marinduque Election 2019. Marinduque, Philippines. Ballot Templates Torrijos . http://www.comelec.gov.ph/php-tpls-attachments/2019NLE/BallotFaceTemplates/REGION_IV-B/MARINDUQUE/TORRIJOS.pdf
 Marinduque Election 2019. Marinduque, Philippines. Ballot Templates Buenavista . http://www.comelec.gov.ph/php-tpls-attachments/2019NLE/BallotFaceTemplates/REGION_IV-B/MARINDUQUE/BUENAVISTA.pdf

2019 Philippine local elections
Elections in Marinduque
May 2019 events in the Philippines